is a Japanese voice actress known for voicing Botan of YuYu Hakusho.

Anime roles
 Akuma-kun (Hyakume)
 Bubblegum Crash (Street Kid (episode 2))
 Chimpui (Hotaru Fujino)
 Crayon Shin-chan: Henderland no Daibouken (Chokiriinu Besuta)
 Dream Hunter Rem (Alpha)
 Genesis Climber Mospeada (Mint Labule)
 Karuizawa Syndrome (Kumiko Kinoshita)
 Lady Lady!! (Lynn Russell)
 Magic Knight Rayearth (Hikari (episode 8))
 Mahou no Angel Sweet Mint (Bell; Bobby)
 Maison Ikkoku (Etsuko)
 New Dream Hunter Rem (OAV) (Alpha)
 Nightwalker (woman)
 Ninku the Movie (Fake Rihoko)
 Norimono Oukoku BuBu ChaCha (Megu)
 O-bake no... Holly (Stinky)
 Obake no Q-Taro (Yoshiko; Miko Koizumi)
 Oedo wa Nemurenai! (OAV) (Kotetsu)
 Psycho Armor Govarian (Layla)
 Rainbow Brite (Rainbow Brite)
 Story of the Alps: My Annette (Daniel Barunieru)
 Super Dimension Century Orguss (Mhoohm)
 Super Dimensional Fortress Macross (Shammy Milliome)
 The Adventures of Scamper the Penguin (Pepe)
 The Mischievous Twins (Doris)
 Tokimeki Tonight (Rinze)
 Transformers: Masterforce (Girl (episode 5))
 Yu Yu Hakusho (Botan)
 Yume no Hoshi no Button Nose'' (Button Nose)

Live-Action Roles 

 Seijuu Sentai Gingaman (Bokku)

Other voice-over work
 Strange Days (Iris)

External links
 

1959 births
Living people
Japanese voice actresses
Voice actresses from Fukushima Prefecture